Yvonne Burke may refer to:
 Yvonne Brathwaite Burke (born 1932), American politician and lawyer from California
 Yvonne Burke (Garda), (born 1970), Irish police (Garda Síochána) officer